Illegal logging is the harvest, transportation, purchase, or sale of timber in violation of laws. The harvesting procedure itself may be illegal, including using corrupt means to gain access to forests; extraction without permission, or from a protected area; the cutting down of protected species; or the extraction of timber in excess of agreed limits. Illegal logging is a driving force for a number of environmental issues such as deforestation, soil erosion and biodiversity loss which can drive larger-scale environmental crises such as climate change and other forms of environmental degradation.

Illegality may also occur during transport, such as illegal processing and export (through fraudulent declaration to customs); the avoidance of taxes and other charges, and fraudulent certification. These acts are often referred to as "wood laundering".

Illegal logging is driven by a number of economic forces, such as demand for raw materials, land grabbing and demand for pasture for cattle. Regulation and prevention can happen at both the supply size, with better enforcement of environmental protections, and at the demand side, such as an increasing regulation of trade as part of the international lumber Industry.

Overview
Illegal logging is a pervasive problem, causing enormous damage to forests, local communities, and the economies of producer countries. The EU, as a major timber importer, has implemented the European Union Timber Regulation as a means to halt the import of illegally sourced wood products. The identification of illegally logged or traded timber is technically difficult. Therefore, a legal basis for normative acts against timber imports or other products manufactured out of illegal wood is missing. Scientific methods to pinpoint the geographic origin of timber are currently under development. Possible actions to restrict imports cannot meet with WTO regulations of non-discrimination. They must instead be arranged in bilateral agreements. TRAFFIC, the wildlife trade monitoring network, strives to monitor the illegal trade of timber and provide expertise in policy and legal reviews.

Scale
It is estimated that illegal logging on public land alone causes losses in assets and revenue in excess of US$10 billion annually. Although exact figures are difficult to calculate, given the illegal nature of the activity, decent estimates show that more than half of the logging that takes place globally is illegal, especially in open and vulnerable areas such as the Amazon Basin, Central Africa, Southeast Asia and the Russian Federation.

Available figures and estimates must be treated with caution. Governments tend to underestimate the situation, given that high estimates of illegal logging may cause embarrassment as these to suggest ineffective enforcement of legislation or, even worse, bribery and corruption. On the other hand, environmental NGOs publish alarming figures to raise awareness and emphasize the need for stricter conservation measures. For companies in the forestry sector, publications making high estimates can be regarded as potentially threatening to their reputation and their market perspective, including the competitiveness of wood in comparison to other materials. However, for many countries, NGOs are the only source of information apart from state institutions, which probably clearly underestimates the true figures. For example, the Republic of Estonia calculated a rate of 1% illegally harvested timber in 2003, whereas it was estimated to reach as much as 50% by the NGO "Estonian Green Movement".  In Latvia, the situation is comparable; anecdotal evidence points towards 25%<ref>WWF Latvia (2003)</rev> The features of illegal logging and related trade in Baltic Sea region; WWF International (2002) The Timber Footprint of the G8 and China</ref> of logging being illegal.

Consequences

Illegal logging contributes to deforestation and by extension global warming, causes loss of biodiversity, and undermines the rule of law. These illegal activities undermine responsible forest management, encourage corruption and tax evasion, and reduce the income of the producer countries, further limiting the resources producer countries can invest in sustainable development. Illegal logging has serious economic and social implications for the poor and disadvantaged with millions of dollars worth of timber revenue being lost each year.

Furthermore, the illegal trade of forest resources undermines international security, and is frequently associated with corruption, money laundering, organized crime, human rights abuses and, in some cases, violent conflict. In the forestry sector, cheap imports of illegal timber and forest products, together with the non-compliance of some economic players with basic social and environmental standards, destabilise international markets. This unfair competition affects those European companies, especially the small and medium-sized companies that are behaving responsibly and ready to play by fair rules.

Illegal logging in Southeast Asia

Indonesia

Myanmar

Cambodia

Thailand

Statistics
The scale of illegal logging represents a major loss of revenue to many countries and can lead to widespread associated environmental damage. A senate committee in the Philippines estimated that the country lost as much as US$1.8bn per year during the 1980s. The Indonesian government estimated in 2002 that costs related to illegal logging are US$3bn each year. The World Bank estimates that illegal logging costs timber-producing countries between 10 and 15 billion euros per year. This compares with 10 billion euros disbursed as EC aid in 2002.

 A joint UK-Indonesian study of the timber industry in Indonesia in 1998 suggested that about 40% of throughput was illegal, with a value in excess of $365 million. More recent estimates, comparing legal harvesting against known domestic consumption plus exports, suggest that 88% of logging in the country is illegal in some way. Malaysia is the key transit country for illegal wood products from Indonesia.
 In Brazil, 80% of logging in the Amazon violates government controls. At the core of illegal logging is widespread corruption. Often referred to as 'green gold', mahogany can fetch over US$1,600 m-3. Illegal mahogany facilitates the illegal logging of other species, and widespread exploitation of the Brazilian Amazon. Recent Greenpeace investigations in the Brazilian state of Pará reveal just how deeply rooted the problem remains. No reliable legal chain of custody exists for mahogany, and the key players in its trade are ruthless.
 The World Bank estimates that 80% of logging operations are illegal in Bolivia and 42% in Colombia, 10 while in Peru, illegal logging constitutes 80% of all activities.
 Research carried out by WWF International in 2002 shows that in Africa, rates of illegal logging vary from 50% for Cameroon and Equatorial Guinea to 70% in Gabon and 80% in Liberia – where revenues from the timber industry also fuelled the civil war.
 WWF estimates that illegal logging in Russia is at least 20%, reaching up to 50% in its far eastern regions.
 A 2012 joint study by the United Nations Environment Programme and Interpol states that illegal logging accounts for up to 30% of the global logging trade and contributes to more than 50% of tropical deforestation in Central Africa, the Amazon Basin and South East Asia.
 Between 50% and 90% of logging from the key countries in these regions is being carried out by organised criminal entities.
A study conducted by TRAFFIC found that 93% of all timber exported from Mozambique to China in 2013 was done so illegally.

In March 2004, Greenpeace carried out actions against a cargo ship transporting timber from the Indonesian company Korindo, which was being imported into France, UK, Belgium and the Netherlands.
Korindo is known to be using illegal timber from the last rainforests of Indonesia. In May 2003, an Indonesian Government investigation confirmed that Korindo was receiving illegal timber from notorious timber barons known to obtain timber from an orang-utan refuge – the Tanjung Puting National Park.
Tanjung Puting National Park is a 4,000-square-kilometre conservation area of global importance. It is recognized as a world biosphere reserve by the United Nations and forms the largest protected area of swamp forest in South-East Asia.

Mitigation

North Asia 

The Europe and North Asia Forest Law Enforcement and Governance (ENA FLEG) Ministerial Conference was held in Saint Petersburg, Russia on 22–25 November 2005. In May 2004, the Russian Federation announced its intention to host the ENA FLEG process, supported by the World Bank. A preparatory conference was held in Moscow in June 2005.

The Saint Petersburg conference brought together nearly 300 participants representing 43 governments, the private sector, civil society, and international organizations. It agreed to the Saint Petersburg Declaration on Forest Law Enforcement and Governance in Europe and North Asia. The Declaration includes an indicative list of actions, intended to serve as a general framework for possible actions to be undertaken by governments as well as civil society.

The conference took place as the United Kingdom prepared to pass the G8 Presidency to Russia. As Valery Roshchupkin, Head of the Federal Forestry Agency of the Russian Federation, confirmed, illegal logging would be of special importance for Russia as the G8 President and for the following G8 Summit, also held in Saint Petersburg.

East Asia 

The East Asia Forest Law Enforcement and Governance (EA FLEG) Ministerial Conference took place in Bali in September 2001. The Conference brought together nearly 150 participants from 20 countries, representing government, international organizations, NGOs, and the private sector. The event was co-hosted by the World Bank and the Government of Indonesia. The meeting included detailed technical discussions of forest law enforcement in relation to governance, forest policy and forest management as well as ministerial engagement.

The Conference's primary aims were to share analysis on forest law enforcement; explore priority issues of forest law enforcement, including illegal logging in the East Asia region, among senior officials from the forest and related ministries, NGOs, and industry representatives; and commit to action at the national and regional level.

European Union 

In May 2003, the European Commission presented the EU Forest Law Enforcement, Governance and Trade Action Plan (EU FLEGT). This marked the beginning of a long process by which the EU aims to develop and implement measures to address illegal logging and related trade. The primary means of implementing the Plan is through Voluntary Partnership Agreements with timber producing countries. The European Union Timber Regulation was adopted in 2010 and went into effect 3 March 2013.

 It prohibits the placing on the EU market for the first time of illegally harvested timber and products derived from such timber;
 It requires EU traders who place timber products on the EU market for the first time to exercise 'due diligence';
 Once on the market, the timber and timber products may be sold on and/or transformed before they reach the final consumer.
 To facilitate the traceability of timber products, economic operators in this part of the supply chain (referred to as traders in the regulation) have an obligation to keep records of their suppliers and customers.

A Greenpeace investigation published in May 2014 demonstrates that EU Timber Regulation is ineffective if fraudulent paperwork is accepted at face value and there is not sufficient enforcement by EU authorities.

United Kingdom
In 2020, the United Kingdom announced it will ban companies from selling items that use raw materials sourced in a way that breaches local laws to protect forests and other natural environments in the country where they are produced. It will force businesses to check more carefully where their materials are coming from. It has been called a "world's first" by Zac Goldsmith, Minister of State for Pacific and the Environment.

Africa 
The Africa Forest Law Enforcement and Governance (AFLEG) Ministerial Conference was held in Yaoundé, Cameroon, in October 2003. The meeting drew together ministers and stakeholders from Africa, Europe, and North America to consider how partnerships between producers, consumers, donors, civil society and the private sector could address illegal forest exploitation and associated trade in Africa.

The AFLEG conference, the second regional forest law enforcement and governance meeting after East Asia, resulted in endorsement of a ministerial declaration and action plan as well as a variety of informal implementation initiatives.

In 2014, the FAU-EU-FLEGT Programme of the Food and Agriculture Organization of the United Nations published the study The Voluntary Partnership Agreement (VPA) process in Central and West Africa: from theory to practice to document and foster strategic reflection in partner countries already engaged in negotiating a VPA - or those who will be entering into such negotiations - by providing examples of good practices. These good practices were identified and recorded following interviews with the main stakeholders in the eight VPA countries in West and Central Africa, the European Forest Institute's (EFI) EU FLEGT Facility and the European Commission. In 2016, the FAO-EU FLEGT Programme published an additional study, Traceability: a management tool for business and governments, providing examples of good practices in the region's traceability systems, which help prevent illegal logging by tracking timber from its forest of origin throughout its journey along the supply chain.

United States

In response to growing concerns over illegal logging and advice from TRAFFIC and other organisations, on 22 May 2008, the U.S. amended the Lacey Act, when the Food, Conservation, and Energy Act of 2008 expanded its protection to a broader range of plants and plant products (Section 8204. Prevention of Illegal Logging Practices).

The requirements under the new Amendments are two-fold. First, the Lacey Act now makes it illegal to import into the United States plants that have been harvested contrary to any applicable Federal Law, State Law, Indian Tribal Law, or Foreign Law. If a plant is found to have been harvested in violation of the laws of the country where it was harvested, that plant would be subject to seizure and forfeiture if imported into the U.S. The Lacey Act also makes it unlawful, beginning 15 December 2008, to import certain plants and plant products without a Plant and Plant Product import declaration.

This Plant and Plant Product Declaration must contain (besides other information) the Genus, Species, and Country of Harvest of every plant found in commercial shipments of certain products, a list of applicable products (along with other requirements and guidance) can be found on the USDA APHIS website.

Australia
The Timber Development Association (TDA) welcomes on June 6, 2014's release by the Australian Department of Agriculture of a position paper on the Illegal Logging Prohibition Regulation and guidance on how timber and wood products industry can comply on the Australian Government - Department of Agriculture official website. The release of the Government's guidance coincides with the release of industry developed timber due diligence tools and information through the industry website of Timber Due Diligence.

The Australian Illegal Logging Prohibition Regulation applies to importers into Australia of "regulated timber products" such as sawn timber, wood panels, pulp, paper products, and wood furniture. The Regulation starts on 30 November 2014 and requires that before import of these products or processing of raw logs, due diligence is undertaken to minimise the risk that the timber products or raw logs were illegally logged or incorporate illegally logged timber.

See also
 Deforestation and climate change
 Environmental crime
 Environmental impact of roads
 Environmental Investigation Agency
 European Anti-Fraud Office
 Environmental vandalism
 Illegal logging in Madagascar
 List of environmental issues
 Reducing emissions from deforestation and forest degradation (REDD)
 Timber mafia
 United Nations Forum on Forests
 UAV monitoring
 Satellite surveillance
 Preventing easy forest access (i.e. roads and waterways)

References

Further reading

External links

 Illegal Logging and Related Timber Trade - Dimensions, Drivers, Impacts and Responses (IUFRO World Series Volume 35) - 2017 report containing results of fifth global scientific assessment undertaken by the International Union of Forest Research Organizations (IUFRO)-led Global Forest Expert Panels (GFEP) initiative 
 Policy Brief based on the report  
 FAO-EU Forest Law Enforcement, Governance and Trade (FLEGT) Programme from the Food and Agriculture Organization of the United Nations
 European Commission page on illegal logging, with links to FLEGT Regulation (adopted in 2005) and EU Timber Regulation (adopted in 2010)
 Forest Legality Alliance
 Environmental Investigation Agency page on investigations related to illegal logging

 
Logging
World forestry
Environmental crime
Environmental issues with forests
International forestry organizations
Forest certification
Forest governance
Forest law
Illegal occupations
Organized crime activity